Odyssey 5 is a Canadian science fiction series, which was shown in 2002 on Space in Canada and on Showtime in the United States. The premise involves five space travelers who witness the destruction of the Earth; they are given the opportunity to travel to the past to identify and prevent the cataclysm.

Odyssey 5 was created by Manny Coto, who was a scriptwriter and executive producer during the series run. Through his website and in interviews, Coto has expressed his interest in returning to the series at some point, either continuing it or giving it a conclusion.

The series was produced in Toronto, Ontario, Canada.

Plot 
The story follows six people, four astronauts, a scientist and a television news reporter, on a routine flight of the space shuttle Odyssey on 7 August 2007. During the flight, the Earth rapidly dissolves into a fiery ball and implodes. Control of the Odyssey is momentarily lost and one astronaut is killed. The remaining five crew members resign themselves to death, but an inorganic being called the Seeker rescues them. The Seeker tells them that 50 other worlds have been destroyed in the same way as Earth and the Seeker has always arrived too late to observe it. This is the first time he has found survivors. He offers to send them five years into the past (to 2002, the year the series was shown) so that they can prevent the disaster. He sends only their consciousnesses back because physical time travel is impossible. The mission commander learns a codeword associated with the disaster: Leviathan.

The villains are a race of disembodied artificial intelligences known as "Sentients". They are trying to learn about humanity through artificial humanoid robots called "Synthetics", which are nearly indistinguishable from humans. Another group of Synthetics is discovered to be from Mars. In the original timeline, a previous race of Synthetics created by humanity was destroyed by a secret US government agency. Whether the destruction of the Earth was retaliation for this act by the Sentients is never revealed.

While they search for the truth, the team must also revisit their pasts while retaining past knowledge of what is to come. Reporter Sarah Forbes tries to save her five-year-old son, who died of cancer in the original timeline. Her efforts in this direction alienate her husband, who leaves her and takes their son with him. Astronaut Angela Perry must deal with the knowledge that her father is a corrupt U.S. senator whose malfeasance destroyed her family in the original timeline. Commander Chuck Taggart must try to keep his family together. His son, Neil, a computer technician on the Odyssey, must adjust to being 17 again when he was a poor student who had not yet discovered his talents. Pessimistic scientist Kurt Mendel believes they cannot change history and spends his time indulging every desire.

The series characters are not friends and frequently disagree. The humanity of the team is shown through arguments, jokes and their attempts to maintain social lives and help the world with their limited knowledge of the future.

Many of the show's plotlines involve technologies like AI, nanotechnology and neuroimaging.

A recurring theme is that the actions of the group may hasten the cataclysm they are trying to avoid or alter history in undesirable ways. A character who was supposed to live until 2007 dies in the first episode after helping the group. In one episode, Sarah and Angela protect a girl they know will be kidnapped. Although this prevents that individual's kidnapping, the kidnapper takes a different child. Kurt makes a large bet on a football game whose outcome is already known to him, but the pressure of knowing has a negative effect on a player instrumental in winning the game, and the team loses.

Cast
Peter Weller – Chuck Taggart, commander of the Odyssey mission and leader of the group when they jump back to the past.
Sebastian Roché – Kurt Mendel, Nobel Prize-winning behavioral geneticist whose atheistic outlook and hedonistic tendencies often bring comic relief to the story.
Christopher Gorham – Neil Taggart, Chuck's son. NASA's youngest astronaut at age 22, he succeeded where his older brother, Marc, had failed. He constantly has to deal with the struggles of growing up again and the repercussions that came with his high school delinquencies.
Tamara Marie Watson – Angela Perry, an astronaut who was rendered unconscious when the Earth imploded, waking up disoriented five years in the past, in her MMU about to burn up in the atmosphere. Her issues following their return have a repercussion on her career, altering her future.
Leslie Silva – Sarah Forbes, a reporter who tagged along with the Odyssey for a report, finding herself back before her son died from cancer and threatening to tear her family apart through her determination not to let him die again.
Gina Clayton – Paige Taggart, the matriarch who struggles to believe that her husband and son are time travelers.

Episodes

Broadcast history 
In the United States, the initial run of the series ran from 28 June 2002 (Episode 2) to 27 February 2003 (Episode 19). Episode 1 (the pilot) is listed as a two-parter. It was aired on 2 October 2002, after, Episode 13.  The series made a full run of all 19 episodes in the United Kingdom on Sky One and on Sci Fi Channel and in Canada. In 2004, the series appeared in Finland on Nelonen and thus could also be seen in Estonia, and in June 2004 it was premiered in Germany on Sat.1. In 2005, it was shown in the Netherlands on NET 5 after midnight. In addition, Odyssey 5 is being or has been shown on RTL Klub in Hungary, and premiered in Australia on the Sci Fi Channel in December 2006 and on channel TV6 in Lithuania in 2008.

It has been shown on Cadena 3 (channel 28) in Mexico, the Sci Fi Channel in the United States, SIC Radical in Portugal, Mega Channel in Greece, TV 3 in Estonia, extreme TV in Spain and AXN Sci Fi in Romania, Poland and Bulgaria.
It was also shown on Channel 3 in Israel.

Home media
The series was released as a complete box set (region 1) in April 2006 and in region 2 territories on 26 June 2006. As an extra feature, the DVD set has a commentary track on the pilot episode by Manny Coto and Peter Weller.

References

External links

Odyssey 5 DVD page at Sony Pictures

2000s Canadian drama television series
2000s Canadian science fiction television series
2002 Canadian television series debuts
2002 Canadian television series endings
Showtime (TV network) original programming
Canadian time travel television series
Television series by Sony Pictures Television
Television shows filmed in Toronto
Space adventure television series
Serial drama television series
English-language television shows
Transhumanism in television series
Television series set in 2007
2000s Canadian time travel television series